Blue and Green Music is a 1919–1921 painting by the American painter Georgia O'Keeffe.

Painted in her New York years upon the idea that music and sound could be translated into something for the eye, Blue and Green Music uses the contrast of hard and soft edges and geometric forms to convey rhythm and movement.

About
The painting uses colors that are both to capture the variance of tones that one would find in music. O'Keeffe described music as being able to be "translated into something for the eye" 

This piece was made while O'Keeffe was living in New York with Alfred Steiglitz. She created many works that referenced music during this time period, saying, "I found that I could say things with color and shapes that I couldn't say any other way--things that I had no words for."

The painting is part of the Alfred Stieglitz collection, a gift by the artist to the museum in memory of her husband.

Notes

1919 paintings
Paintings in the collection of the Art Institute of Chicago
Paintings by Georgia O'Keeffe